The Lyric Poetry Award is given once a year to a member of the Poetry Society of America and was "established under the will of PSA member Mrs. Consuelo Ford (Althea Urn), and also in memory of Mary Carolyn Davies, for a lyric poem on any subject."

Each winner receives a $500 prize.

Winners
2010: Ira Sadoff, Judge: Meghan O'Rourke
2009: Susan Kinsolving, Judge: Lucie Brock-Broido
2008: Wayne Miller, Judge: Elizabeth Macklin
2007: Ed Skoog, Judge: Srikanth Reddy
2006: Alice Jones, Judge: Toi Derricotte 
2005: Lee Upton, Judge: Susan Wheeler
2004: Carol Ciavonne, Judge: D.A. Powell
2002: Shira Dentz, Judge: Mark Levine
2001: Gary Young

Notes

See also
 Poetry Society of America
 List of American literary awards
 List of poetry awards
 List of years in poetry

External links
 Poetry Society of America main awards Web page

American poetry awards
Awards established in 2001